Cymatophorina is a monotypic moth genus of the family Drepanidae first described by Arnold Spuler in  1908. Its only species, Cymatophorina diluta, the oak lutestring or lesser lutestring, was described by Michael Denis and Ignaz Schiffermüller in 1775. It is found in much of Europe, with subspecies Cymatophorina diluta hartwiegi occurring in Britain.

The wingspan is 33–36 mm. The species is univoltine. Adults are on wing between late July and early October, depending on location. Subspecies Cymatophorina diluta hartwiegi flies in August and September.

The larvae feed on the leaves of oak trees.

References

External links

Moths and Butterflies of Europe and North Africa
Fauna Europaea
Lepiforum.de

Moths described in 1775
Thyatirinae
Drepanid moths of Great Britain
Taxa named by Michael Denis
Taxa named by Ignaz Schiffermüller
Monotypic moth genera